Fanatic Crisis (Japanese: ファナティック・クライシス, often stylized as FANATIC◇CRISIS, and simply called FtC by fans) was a Japanese rock band active from 1992–2005. They were called  "the big four of visual kei bands" along with Malice Mizer, Shazna and La'cryma Christi during their prime. While they first got their start as a visual kei band, they distanced themselves from the movement after signing with Stoic Stone in 1999.

History

Formation
The band was formed in 1992 in Nagoya, as part of the Nagoya kei movement, among similar bands such as Kuroyume, Rouage, and Laputa. In 1993, Shun joined on guitar. In 1994, they self-released their first demo-tape Karma, with Tatsuya on drums. Tatsuya left after the release of their first independent EP Taiyou no Toriko, published by the label Noir, in 1995. In 1996, Tohru joined, after leaving the visual band Of-J, and joined on drums. That year, they released their first independent album Mask and second independent EP Marble. Afterwards, their lineup remained consistent until their subsequent breakup in 2005.

Major Debut
Their major label breakthrough came after signing with For Life Records, where they released two albums, One -one for all- and The Lost Innocent. One -one for all- was named one of the top albums from 1989-1998 in a 2004 issue of the music magazine Band Yarouze. In 2000, they switched to the Stoic Stone label (from which all subsequent albums were published) and released their sixth record, EAS. Five albums would follow before their last record, 2004's Marvelous+.

Disbandment and Post-Fanatic Crisis Work
In 2005, they played their final concert at Tokyo Bay NK Hall. Since their breakup, Ishizuki has been the most active in recording music as a solo artist. Kazuya joined with vocalist Aoi to form the band Bounty (currently on hiatus). Afterwards, Shun and Kazuya joined with Zero and Tsukasa (from D'espairs Ray) and Ricky (from Dasein) to form the group THE MICRO HEAD 4N'S.

Members
 Tsutomu Ishizuki - vocals (1992-2005), drums (1992-1994, 1996-1997)
 Ryuji - bass guitar (1992-2005)
 Kazuya - lead guitar (1992-2005)
 Shun - rhythm guitar (1994-2005)
 Tatsuya - drums (1994-1996)
 Tohru - drums (1997-2005)

Timeline

Discography

Studio Albums

EPs

Compilations

Singles

Videography

Other

References

Visual kei musical groups
Japanese alternative rock groups
Japanese power pop groups
Japanese gothic rock groups
Japanese post-punk music groups
Musical groups established in 1992
Musical groups from Aichi Prefecture